Cheri L. Canon, M.D., is an abdominal radiologist at the University of Alabama at Birmingham (UAB) Department of Radiology. She currently serves as a professor and as the Witten-Stanley Endowed Chair of Radiology in the department of radiology at UAB.

Education 
Canon completed her undergraduate training at the University of Texas at Austin, obtaining a bachelor of science in zoology.  Afterward, she attended medical school at the University of Texas Medical Branch in Galveston, TX. After completing medical school with honors, she completed a diagnostic radiology residency at the University of Alabama at Birmingham (UAB), until she joined the faculty in the abdominal imaging section of UAB in 1998.

Career
Canon served as a professor in the University of Alabama school of medicine after joining faculty in the department of radiology in 1998. She served as the University of Alabama School of Medicine Curriculum Committee chair when an organ-based curriculum was implemented in 2001. From 2003 to 2008 she was the radiology residency program director, in addition to serving as the vice-chair of education from 2004 to 2008.

From 2008 to 2011, Canon was the division director of diagnostic radiology (2008-2011) and senior vice chair of operations (2009-2011) before she was appointed interim chair of radiology in 2010 and chair in 2011. She was also chosen to be a part of the UAB Healthcare Leadership Academy inaugural class. 

Canon served as an oral examiner for the American Board of Radiology (ABR) from 2002 to 2014, served as a member of the Board of Trustees from 2016 to 2018, and now sits on its Board of Governors for which she was appointed the position in 2018. She was the vice president of the American College of Radiology (ACR) from 2016 to 2017, chancellor on the board from 2010 to 2017, and previously served as the chair of the ACR Commission on Education 2010 to 2016. She is the President-elect of the Society of Chairs of Academic Radiology Departments (SCARD), which was first appointed in 2018 and the co-creator of LEAD, a new women’s leadership development program jointly developed by SCARD and GE Healthcare. Additionally, she sits on the boards of directors for the Association of University Radiologists, the Society of Abdominal Radiology, and the Academy of Radiology Research Academic Council. She is also active in the Birmingham community and is a member of the Birmingham Rotary Club. She is the president for MOMENTUM, a Birmingham women’s leadership organization.

Research 
Canon’s research interest includes diseases of the esophagus and imaging of the postoperative patient. Additional topics include resident education, diversity and inclusion, and leadership development. In addition to her peer-reviewed publications, her other editorial experience includes one book contribution, multiple book chapters, and four leadership webinars with the American College of Radiology leadership institute. Furthermore, Canon has served as an editorial reviewer for multiple peer-reviewed journals, including the American Journal of Roentgenology, World Journal of Gastrointestinal Endoscopy, and Journal of the American College of Radiology. In addition to her multiple publications, she has also given over 170 presentations at different events.

Awards and honors 
 Semifinalist – Aunt Minnie – Most Effective Radiology Educator: 2012, 2015 
 Medical Technology Schools 25 Top Radiology Professors:  2015 
 Recognition of Exceptional Manuscript Review for 2014, JACR:  2014
 American Board of Radiology Lifetime Service Award:  2013 
 American Board of Radiology Distinguished Service Award: 2012
 UAB Argus Award: Best Guest Lecturer Nominee:  2002, 2003, 2005, 2007-2010
 UAB Department of Radiology Top 10 Teaching Award:  2009, 2010
 YWCA Momentum Women's Leadership Program, selected for 5th class: 2006
 Herbert M. Stauffer Award for Best Education Paper for 2005:  2006
 UAB President’s Award for Excellence in Teaching:  2002

References 

American radiologists
University of Alabama at Birmingham faculty
Year of birth missing (living people)
Living people
Women radiologists
American medical academics